Li Qun may refer to:
 Li Qun (artist) (1912–2012), Chinese artist
 Li Qun (politician) (born 1962), Chinese politician
 Li Qun (basketball) (born 1973), Chinese basketball coach